Carla Balenda (born Sally Bliss, November 22, 1925) is an American former film and television actress.

Early life
She was born on November 22, 1925, in Carthage, New York, U.S. She attended high school in Baldwin, Long Island, and participated in summer stock theatre.

Career
Balenda had contracts with RKO Pictures and Columbia Pictures, but a 1954 newspaper article noted, "she didn't really hit her stride until she was chosen to be Mickey Rooney's TV love."

After being billed as Sally Bliss in "a few minor roles in RKO productions," she changed her name to Carla Balenda. She explained: "Sally Bliss was just too cute. And I'm not cute at all. That name would type me, probably in ingenue roles -- and I'm not the type."

On television, Balenda portrayed Pat in The Mickey Rooney Show (1954-1955) and Betty Leonard on The Adventures of Dr. Fu Manchu (1955-1956).

Filmography

Television
 The Mickey Rooney Show: Hey, Mulligan (1954–55)
 The Adventures of Dr. Fu Manchu (1956)
 Perry Mason (1962)
 Wagon Train (1963)
 Lassie (1958–63)

References

External links
 

1925 births
Living people
American film actresses
American television actresses
RKO Pictures contract players
20th-century American actresses
People from Carthage, New York
21st-century American women